Al Ackland (born c. 1940) is a former Canadian football offensive end. Ackland played in two games for the Winnipeg Blue Bombers of the Canadian Football League during the 1961 season.

References 

1940s births
Players of Canadian football from Manitoba
Canadian football people from Winnipeg
Canadian football offensive linemen
Winnipeg Blue Bombers players
Living people